Clive Lawson Yewers (16 October 1922 – 24 August 1975) was an Australian rules footballer who played with Footscray in the Victorian Football League (VFL).

Family
The son of Harley Le Strange Yewers (1891–1975), and Frances Ellen Yewers (1892–1954), née Carroll, Clive Lawson Yewers was born at  Footscray, Victoria on 16 October 1922.

He married Eva Gwendoline Graham in 1947.

Military service
He served in the Second AIF, having enlisted on 30 December 1942.

Football

Footscray (VFL)
Yewers made his debut for the Footscray First XVIII in the match against South Melbourne, at the Lake Oval, on 28 June 1947. Selected as 20th man, he replaced the injured Arthur Olliver in the second half, and scored a goal with his first kick in VFL football.

Yarraville (VFA)
Cleared from Footscray in 1949, he played in six senior games in the 1949 season.

Death
He died at Hastings Hospital on 24 August 1975.

See also
 List of first kick/first goal kickers in the VFL/AFL

Notes

References
 
 World War Two Nominal Roll: Private Clive Lawson Yewers (VX131298/V175350), Department of Veterans' Affairs.
 B883, VX131298: World War Two Service Record: Private Clive Lawson Yewers (VX131298), National Archives of Australia.

External links 

1922 births
1975 deaths
Australian rules footballers from Melbourne
Western Bulldogs players
West Footscray Football Club players
Australian Army personnel of World War II
Australian Army soldiers
People from Footscray, Victoria
Military personnel from Melbourne